The BENE-League is a multinational handball competition for men's teams from Belgium and the Netherlands, which started in January 2008 under the name BENE-LIGA. Between 2010 and 2014, Luxembourg teams also participated in the tournament that was then called Benelux League.

History 
The idea of setting up a collaboration between the Belgian and Dutch top clubs dates back to the 1980s. However, as in many other sports, it was mainly talked about. However, in 2006 it all became more concrete. A system was devised to better frame the friendly matches from the preparation period, and a knock-out system was set up: quarter-finals in round-trip matches between the top 4 from Belgium and the Netherlands, and the winners would compete in a Final 4. At the end of 2007 it was announced that eight teams from the Netherlands and Belgium would compete against each other. The goal was to start a full Bene Liga competition in 2010 with more teams from the Low Countries.

The first edition of the Bene Liga was played in 2008 as a kind of cup formula. On the Belgian side, the first was kicked off by Initia Hasselt, Tongeren, Neerpelt and KV Sasja HC. Volendam, Aalsmeer, Hellas and Bevo HC from the Netherlands took part. The start of the BENE-Liga was, symbolically, announced in Baarle-Hertog. Evert ten Napel, a well-known Dutch sports reporter led the press conference. In the first edition of the BENE-Liga, KV Sasja became champion.

2021–22 season
Below is the list of clubs that are members of the 2021–22 BENE-League Handball season.

Below is the list of winners, finalists and other participants of Final four BENE-League tournaments.

Hosts

Records and statistics

By club

By country

External links
 Official website

BENE
Handball in the Netherlands
Handball leagues in Belgium
BENE
Professional sports leagues in the Netherlands
Professional sports leagues in Belgium
Multi-national professional sports leagues